Jonathan Stephen Thomas Denning (born 3 January 1991) is a Welsh former first-class cricketer.

Denning was born at Abergavenny in January 1991. He was educated at Monmouth School, before going up to Cardiff Metropolitan University. While studying at Cardiff, he made two appearances in first-class cricket for Cardiff MCCU in 2013 against Glamorgan and Kent. Denning scored 28 runs in these matches, in addition to taking 3 wickets with his left-arm fast-medium bowling. In addition to playing first-class cricket, Denning also played minor counties cricket for Wales Minor Counties from 2009–15 and Buckinghamshire in 2016.

References

External links

1991 births
Living people
Alumni of Cardiff Metropolitan University
Buckinghamshire cricketers
Cardiff MCCU cricketers
Cricketers from Abergavenny
People educated at Monmouth School for Boys
Wales National County cricketers
Welsh cricketers